The 9th Asian Table Tennis Championships 1988 were held in Niigata, Japan, from 15 to 22 May 1988. It was organised by the Japan Table Tennis Association under the authority of Asian Table Tennis Union (ATTU) and International Table Tennis Federation (ITTF).

Medal summary

Medal table

Events

See also
World Table Tennis Championships
Asian Cup

References

Asian Table Tennis Championships
Asian Table Tennis Championships
Table Tennis Championships
Table tennis competitions in Japan
Asian Table Tennis Championships
Asian Table Tennis Championships